The 1936 Tour de France was the 30th edition of the Tour de France, one of cycling's Grand Tours. The Tour began in Paris with a flat stage on 7 July, and Stage 13b occurred on 22 July with an individual time trial to Montpellier. The race finished in Paris on 2 August.

Stage 1
7 July 1936 – Paris to Lille,

Stage 2
8 July 1936 – Lille to Charleville,

Stage 3
9 July 1936 – Charleville to Metz,

Stage 4
10 July 1936 – Metz to Belfort,

Stage 5
11 July 1936 – Belfort to Evian,

Rest day 1
12 July 1936 – Evian

Stage 6
13 July 1936 – Evian to Aix-les-Bains,

Stage 7
14 July 1936 – Aix-les-Bains to Grenoble,

Stage 8
15 July 1936 – Grenoble to Briançon,

Stage 9
16 July 1936 – Briançon to Digne,

Rest day 2
17 July 1936 – Digne

Stage 10
18 July 1936 – Digne to Nice,

Stage 11
19 July 1936 – Nice to Cannes,

Rest day 3
20 July 1936 – Cannes

Stage 12
17 July 1936 – Cannes to Marseille,

Stage 13a
17 July 1936 – Marseille to Nîmes,

Stage 13b
17 July 1936 – Nîmes to Montpellier,  (ITT)

References

1936 Tour de France
Tour de France stages